Senior petty officer is a non-commissioned officer rank in the Irish Naval Service (Irish: Ard-Mhion-Oifigeach Sinsearach). 
The rank is deemed equivalent to a member of the NATO armed forces ranked E-6, making it the equivalent of a Petty officer First Class in the US Navy or Petty officer in the Royal Navy. The rank is one grade below an Irish Chief petty officer and one above Petty officer.

References

Naval ranks
Non-commissioned officers
Military ranks of Ireland